David Tavaré (born December 20, 1984) is a Spanish singer and house music DJ.

Biography
David Tavaré was born on December 20, 1984 in Pollença, Spain. He is the son of a legendary Spanish guitar player. Two of his uncles are English comedian Jim Tavaré and former England Test cricketer Chris Tavaré.

Tavaré was brought up on a holiday island and the Mediterranean way of life inspired him. He had always dreamed of being a singer but when he saw Operación Triunfo, the Spanish version of Pop Idol on television, he knew: “This is what I want, I want to sing on a stage”. One of the three finalists of the successful television show, David Bustamante, was his singing teacher.

Music career
"Hot Summer Night (Oh La La La)" was his second song, featuring 2 Eivissa, released first in July 2007 in Spain, where it was a number two hit, then twelve months later in France where it was also successful, becoming one of the summer hits.

Tavaré released his first studio album La vida viene y va in late 2008.
The next single after "Hot Summer Night" was "Call Me Baby (If You Don't Know My Name)". Its music video was released in November 2008.

Discography

Studio albums

Singles

References

External links
 https://www.davidtavare.es

Living people
1984 births
People from Mallorca
21st-century Spanish singers
21st-century Spanish male singers